William Parlane (27 November 1908 – 1988) was a Scottish footballer who played for Dumbarton, St Mirren and Queen's Park during the 1930s. During his first spell with Dumbarton, he earned two caps for the Scotland amateur team.

His brothers John (his twin) and Alex also played for both Dumbarton and Scotland Amateurs. Another brother Jimmy was also a footballer, and the father of former Rangers and Scotland player Derek Parlane.

References 

Scottish footballers
Dumbarton F.C. players
Queen's Park F.C. players
Scottish Football League players
Scotland amateur international footballers
People educated at Hermitage Academy
St Mirren F.C. players
1908 births
1988 deaths
Date of death missing
Association football forwards
Sportspeople from Argyll and Bute
Twin sportspeople